Kid Dynamite is the first album by Philadelphia hardcore punk band Kid Dynamite. It was released in 1998 by Jade Tree Records.

Track listing
 "Pause" – 1:14
 "K05-0564" – 1:50
 "Sweet Shop Syndicate" – 0:19
 "Table 19" – 1:49
 "Ph. Decontrol" – 0:46
 "Showoff" – 1:14
 "Bookworm" – 1:59
 "Scarysmurf" – 0:22
 "The Ronald Miller Story" – 1:05
 "Bench Warmer" – 1:33
 "Zuko's Back in Town" – 1:17
 "Never Met the Gooch" – 2:00
 "News at 11" – 1:14
 "32 Frames per Second" – 0:19
 "Pacifier" – 2:05
 "3 O'Clock" – 2:20
 "Shiner" – 2:13
 "Wrist Rocket" – 1:36
 "Fuckuturn" – 1:51

Credits 
 Jason Shevchuk – vocals
 Dr. Dan Yemin – guitar
 Steve Farrell – bass
 Dave Wagenschutz – drums

References

1998 albums
Kid Dynamite (band) albums
Jade Tree (record label) albums
Albums produced by Steve Evetts